Corticosteroid 11-β-dehydrogenase isozyme 2 also known as 11-β-hydroxysteroid dehydrogenase 2 is an enzyme that in humans is encoded by the  gene.

Function 

Corticosteroid 11-β-dehydrogenase isozyme 2 is an NAD+-dependent enzyme expressed in aldosterone-selective epithelial tissues such as the kidney, colon, salivary and sweat glands. HSD211B2 expression is also found in the brainstem in a small, aldosterone-sensitive subset of neurons located in the nucleus of the solitary tract referred to as HSD2 neurons.

In these tissues, HSD11B2 oxidizes the glucocorticoid cortisol to the inactive metabolite cortisone, thus preventing illicit activation of the mineralocorticoid receptor. This protective mechanism is necessary because cortisol circulates at 100- to 1000-fold higher concentrations than aldosterone, and binds with equal affinity to the mineralocorticoid receptor, thereby out-competing aldosterone in cells that do not produce HSD11B2.

This glucocorticoid-inactivating enzyme is also expressed in tissues that do not express the mineralocorticoid receptor, such as the placenta and testis, as well as parts of the developing brain, including the rhombencephalic progenitor cells that proliferate into cerebellar granule cells. In these tissues, HSD11B2 protects cells from the growth-inhibiting and/or pro-apoptotic effects of cortisol, particularly during embryonic development.

Clinical significance 

Inhibition of this enzyme, for example by the compound glycyrrhizin, found in natural liquorice, results in a condition known as pseudohyperaldosteronism. A genetically inherited deficiency of HSD11B2 is the underlying cause of the syndrome of apparent mineralocorticoid excess.

References

Further reading

EC 1.1.1